Nunue is an associated commune on the island of Bora Bora, in French Polynesia. According to the 2017 census, it had a population of 5,614 people.

References

Populated places in the Society Islands